Shigenori (written: , , , , , ,  or ) is a masculine Japanese given name. Notable people with the name include:

, Japanese writer
, Japanese footballer
, Japanese daimyō
, Japanese general
Shigenori Mori (born 1958), Japanese golfer
, Japanese voice actor
, Japanese politician
, Japanese sumo wrestler
, Japanese actor and voice actor

Japanese masculine given names